Dhaka Art Summit is an art summit held in Dhaka, Bangladesh and is organised by Samdani Art Foundation, a non- profit art infrastructure development organisation founded by Nadia Samdani. and Rajeeb Samdani in 2011.

About 
The summit displays artworks such as paintings, photography, sculptures, installations, digital art, video art, etc.

2012
The 1st edition of the Summit was held in collaboration with Shilpakala Academy and Bangladesh National Museum and showcased the works of 249 artists and 19 galleries. The 1st edition of the Summit focused only on the local artists and galleries. The Summit was visited over 40,000 visitors. The Summit also organised a few session of talks which was participated by a group of international and local art 

Samdani Art Foundation also awarded the Samdani Artist Development Award to Khaled Hasan and Samdani Young Talent Award to Musrat Reazi at the closing ceremony of Dhaka Art Summit.

The award was judged by a panel of international judges that consisted of Kyla McDonald, Assistant Curator from Tate Modern Museum; Deepak Ananth, a professor at the Ecole des Beaux Arts in France; Elaine W. Ng, Editor and Publisher of Art Asia Pacific Magazine; Bose Krishnamachari, founder of Kochi Biennale; renowned artist Ravinder Reddy from India, and Paris-based Bangladeshi artist Shahabuddin Ahmed.

2014 
The 2nd edition of Dhaka Art Summit took place in collaboration with Bangladesh Shilpakala Academy from 7 to 9 February 2014. From its 2nd edition onwards, the Summit decided to focus on South Asia. DAS 2014 featured a wide range of programmes including five curatorial exhibitions by international and Bangladeshi curators, 14 solo art projects curated by the artistic director of the Samdani Foundation Diana Campbell Betancourt that celebrated artists from across South Asia. The summit featured a citywide public art project, performances, screening of experimental films, speaker's panel and participation of 15 Bangladeshi and 17 South Asia focused galleries.

The Samdani Art Award was also presented to a young Bangladeshi artist Ayesha Sultana, during the Dhaka Art Summit, the winner was selected by an international jury panel which was chaired by Aaron Cezar (Director, Delfina Foundation) and included Adriano Pedrosa (Independent curator), Jessica Morgan (Daskalopoulos Curator, International Art, Tate Modern), Sandhini Poddar (Associate Curator, Guggenheim Museum) and Pooja Sood (Director, KHOJ India). The winning artist received a three-month residency at the Delfina Foundation in the United Kingdom.

2016

The 3rd edition of Dhaka Art Summit was held from 5 to 8 February 2016 in Dhaka.
Seventeen Solo Projects, curated by Samdani Art Foundation Artistic Director Diana Campbell Betancourt, included thirteen newly commissioned works and three works reconfigured within the Bangladeshi context, reflecting the productive nature of DAS. The first DAS project commissioned by the Samdani Art Foundation, VIP Project (Dhaka) by Po Po, was first unveiled at the 8th Asia Pacific Triennial, 2015 in Brisbane. The solo projects celebrated pluralism and looked at the fluid continuum of birth and experience in becoming an individual, book-ended by Lynda Benglis and Tino Sehgal and with Shumon Ahmed, Tun Win Aung and Wah Nu, Simryn Gill, Waqas Khan, Shakuntala Kulkarni, Prabhavati Meppayil, Haroon Mirza, Amanullah Mojadidi, Sandeep Mukherjee, Po Po, Dayanita Singh, Ayesha Sultana and Christopher Kulendran Thomas, Munem Wasif and Mustafa Zaman.

This time in addition to new commissions and curated group exhibitions, DAS included talks, critical writing ensembles, performances, film programme, book launches and the Summit's first historical exhibition, Rewind and artists were Rashid Choudhury, Monika Correa, Germaine Krull, Nalini Malini, Anwar Jalal Shemza, Bagyi Aung Soe, and Lionel Wendt, among others. The Samdani Art Award finalists exhibition curated by Daniel Baumann (Director, Kunsthalle Zurich) ; The Missing One curated by Nada Raza (Research Curator, Tate Research Centre) and artists include  Neha Choksi, Iftikhar Dadi, Shishir Bhattacharjee, Firoz Mahmud, Rohini Devasher, David Chalmers Alesworth, Mariam Suhail, Hajra Waheed, Himali Singh Soin among others. ; Architecture in Bangladesh curated by Aurelién Lemonier (Curator of Centre Pompidou); The Performance Pavilion Shifting Sands Shifting Hands, curated by Nikhil Chopra, Madhavi Gore and Jana Prepeluh; Not as far as it seems, a series of conversations and sound pieces curated by Safina Radio Project; a Film Programme curated by Shanay Jhaveri (Assistant Curator of South Asian Art, Metropolitan Museum of Art, New York) ; as well as Critical Writing Ensemble, panel discussions and children workshop conducted by VAST Bhutan.

The winner of this year's Samdani Art Award is yound Bangladeshi Photographer Rasel Chowdhury. The jury panel consisted of Catherine David (Deputy Director, Centre Pompidou, Paris), Aaron Seeto (Curatorial Manager, Asian and Pacific Art, QAGOMA, Brisbane), Cosmin Costinas (Director, Para/Site Art Space, Hong Kong), and Beatrix Ruf (Director, Stedelijk Museum, Amsterdam), chaired by Aaron Cezar (Director of Delfina Foundation, UK). The award show was curated by Daniel Baumann, who is the Director of the Kunsthalle Zurich, Switzerland. The winning artist received a three-month residency at the Delfina Foundation in the United Kingdom.

2018

The 2008 Dhaka Art Summit took place from 2 to 10 February 2018.

2020 
Dhaka Art Summit 2020 took place from 7–15 February 2020. Dhaka Art Summit 2020 was the most 'ambitious edition to date', presenting work by over 500 cross-disciplinary artists, scholars, curators, and thinkers.

2023
Dhaka Art Summit 2023 took place from 3–11 February 2023 at  Bangladesh Shilpakala Academy.

References

External links
 
 Art Going Global, The Daily Star
 The art market: All new in Delhi, Financial Times of India, January 27, 2012
 Dhaka Art Summit, agi Asian Global Impact Sep 19, 2013
 Lucky on Dhaka Art Summit '14: Cutting edge art in Bangladesh, htSyndication Aug 15 2013 
 Indian artists at second Dhaka Art Summit, Business Standard August 5, 2013
 "Flossed" Over, ARTslanT India
 Climb to the Summit, The Financial Express Jul 19 2013
 South Asian mosaic on Dhaka Art Summit palette, newsR July 18 2013
 South Asian mosaic on Dhaka Art Summit palette, WN
 South Asian mosaic on Dhaka Art Summit palette, Business Standard July 18, 2013
 South Asian mosaic on Dhaka Art Summit palette, webindia123
 South Asian mosaic on Dhaka Art Summit palette, YAHOO! News India July 18, 2013
 Samdani Art Foundation in collaboration with Bangladesh National Academy of Fine and Performing Arts, News Today
 দ্বিতীয় ঢাকা আর্ট সামিটের ঘোষণা :: খবর :: কালের কণ্ঠ
 Dhaka Art Summit, News Today
 ‘Dhaka Art Summit 2014’ to bring international focus to South Asian contemporary art practices, theindependent July 18, 2013

Art Summit
Entertainment events in Bangladesh
Arts festivals in Bangladesh